The Notorious Cherry Bombs is the only studio album by the American country music group The Notorious Cherry Bombs, a band that formerly served as country singer Rodney Crowell's backing band in the 1980s. This is the band's only studio album, with Crowell and Vince Gill alternating as lead vocalists. Released in 2004 on Universal South Records, the album produced one chart single in "It's Hard to Kiss the Lips at Night That Chew Your Ass Out All Day Long". "Making Memories of Us" was previously recorded by Tracy Byrd on his 2003 album The Truth About Men, and later in 2004 by Keith Urban on his album Be Here; Urban's rendition was released as a single, reaching Number One on the country charts in 2005.

Track listing
"Let It Roll, Let It Ride" (Rodney Crowell, Vince Gill) – 3:53
"If I Ever Break Your Heart" (Crowell) – 3:25
"Wait a Minute" (Crowell, Hank DeVito) – 2:49
"Making Memories of Us" (Crowell) – 4:05
"Oklahoma Dust" (Gill, Leslie Satcher) – 2:35
"Dangerous Curves" (Crowell, Gill) – 4:21
"Forever Someday" (Gill) – 3:32
"On the Road to Ruin" (Crowell) – 3:27
"Heart of a Jealous Man" (Gill, Max D. Barnes) – 4:02
"It's Hard to Kiss the Lips at Night That Chew Your Ass Out All Day Long" (Crowell, Gill) – 4:24
"Sweet Little Lisa" (DeVito, Donivan Cowart, Walter Cowart) – 2:44
"Let It Roll, Let It Ride" (reprise) (Crowell, Gill) – 7:09A

ATrack 12 includes an alternate version of "It's Hard to Kiss the Lips at Night That Chew Your Ass Out All Day Long" as a hidden track.

Personnel

The Notorious Cherry Bombs
 Eddie Bayers – drums, percussion, background vocals
 Richard Bennett – acoustic guitar, electric guitar, bouzouki, cavaquinho, six-string bass guitar
 Tony Brown – piano, keyboards, "preaching"
 Rodney Crowell – acoustic guitar, "faux steel guitar", lead vocals, background vocals
 Hank DeVito – acoustic guitar, steel guitar, Dobro, background vocals
 Vince Gill – acoustic guitar, electric guitar, mandolin, banjo, Dobro, lead vocals, background vocals
 John Hobbs – piano, keyboards, organ, background vocals
 Michael Rhodes – bass guitar, background vocals

Additional musicians
 Jenny Gill – background vocals on "Dangerous Curves"
 Steve Herman – trumpet
 Jim Horn – tenor saxophone, baritone saxophone
 Larrie Londin – drums on "Let It Roll, Let It Ride (Reprise)"
 Mike Porter – tambourine on "Let It Roll, Let It Ride (Reprise)"

Technical
 Donivan Cowart – recording
 Steve Marcantonio – recording, mixing
 The Notorious Cherry Bombs – production
 Hank Williams – mastering

Chart performance

References

2004 debut albums
Rodney Crowell albums
Vince Gill albums
The Notorious Cherry Bombs albums
Show Dog-Universal Music albums